The men's 10,000 metres at the 2015 World Championships in Athletics was held at the Beijing National Stadium on 22 August.

Summary
While Ethiopians Haile Gebrselassie, Kenenisa Bekele and on the women's side Tirunesh Dibaba had all done it before, Mo Farah had the opportunity to be the first non-Ethiopian runner to defend a world 10,000 metres championship.  The Kenyan triumvirate of Geoffrey Kipsang Kamworor, Paul Kipngetich Tanui and Bedan Karoki Muchiri took the race out, multiple 64 second laps breaking the race apart to the point that there were only two remaining stragglers, Farah and his American training partner Galen Rupp.  Farah, Rupp and Tanui were all returning from top 5 finishes two years earlier.  As the pace dropped, Farah briefly showed his intent to win with 3200, 1500 and 1200 to go, but each time Farah poked into the lead the Kenyan team quickly scrambled to retake the lead.  Then with 500 metres to go to the finish, Farah boldly launched his long assault for the finish.	
In championship races, long sprints to the finish usually lead to defeat as the more sprint inclined racers are able to run down the breakaway near the finish, but Farah held the lead as the three, then two Kenyan rivals jockeyed for position to catch him.  In the final turn as he was maneuvering through traffic, Kipsang got close enough to clip Farah's heels, with Farah stumbling and almost falling.	
Farah stayed on his feet with Kipsang close behind, then Tanui managed to pull even with Kipsang through the final turn.  Coming into the final straight, World Cross Country champion Kipsang looked like he would be able to swing around Farah to victory, but a determined Farah instead accelerated pulling away to a clear win, celebrating as he crossed the finish line.  Farah's final lap time was 54.15.  For the second time in a row, Tanui found himself in bronze medal position.

Records
Prior to the competition, the records were as follows:

Qualification standards

Schedule

Results
The race was started at 20:50.

References

10,000
10,000 metres at the World Athletics Championships